The Office characters may refer to:

 List of The Office (U.S. TV series) characters
 The Office (UK TV series)#Characters